Paul McEwan may refer to:
 Paul McEwan (cricketer)
 Paul McEwan (actor)

See also
 Paul MacEwan, member of the Nova Scotia House of Assembly